The Waukesha Biota (also known as Waukesha Lagerstätte, Brandon Bridge Lagerstätte, or Brandon Bridge fauna) is an important fossil site located in Waukesha and Franklin, Milwaukee County within the state of Wisconsin. This biota is preserved in certain strata within the Brandon Bridge Formation, which dates to the early Silurian period. It is known for the exceptional preservation of soft-bodied organisms, including many species found nowhere else in rocks of similar age. The site's discovery was announced in 1985, leading to a plethora of discoveries. This biota is one of the few well studied Lagerstättes (exceptional fossil sites) from the Silurian, making it important in our understanding of the period's biodiversity. Some of the species are not easily classified into known animal groups, showing that much research remains to be done on this site. Other taxa that are normally common in Silurian deposits are rare here, but trilobites are quite common.

History and significance 
The discovery of the Waukesha Biota was first published in 1985 by paleontologists D. G. Mikulic, D.  E. G. Briggs, and Joanne Kluessendorf.  At the time this site was one of only several known that preserved soft-body parts in fossils. Examples of other sites of this type known at the time were the famous Cambrian aged Burgess shale in British Columbia, and the Carboniferous aged Mazon Creek fossil beds in northern Illinois. This was the only one of its kind known from the Silurian, meaning it was instrumental in the study of early Paleozoic soft-bodied organisms. Since then other Lagerstättes from the Silurian (like the Eramosa lagerstatte) have been found, but none have the same faunal diversity that the Waukesha Biota has. The exceptional preservation of the fossils of the Waukesha Biota thus provides a window to a significant portion of Silurian life that otherwise may have been undetected and therefore unknown to science.

Stratigraphy and depositional environment 
Most of the Waukesha Biota is preserved within a  layer of thinly-laminated, fine-grained, shallow marine sediments of the Brandon Bridge Formation consisting of mudstone and dolomite deposited in a sedimentary trap at the end of an erosional scarp over the eroded dolomites of the Schoolcraft and Burnt Bluff Formations. Fossils of unambiguous, fully terrestrial organisms are lacking from the Waukesha Biota. Most of the Waukesha Biota fossils were found at a quarry in Waukesha County, Wisconsin, owned and operated by the Waukesha Lime and Stone Company. The Franklin fossils were from blasted material apparently originating from a horizon and setting equivalent to that of the Waukesha site. Its biota is similar to that from the Waukesha site, except that it lacks trilobites.

Taphonomy 
Taphonomy is the study of how organisms decay and become fossilized or preserved in the paleontological record. The taphonomy of the Waukesha Biota is unusual in preserving few of the kinds of animals that typically dominate the Silurian fossil record, including in other strata of the same two quarries. Fossils of corals, echinoderms, brachiopods, bryozoans, gastropods, bivalves, and cephalopods are rare or absent from the Waukesha Biota, although trilobites are diverse and common.

The exceptional preservation of non-biomineralized and lightly skeletonized remains of the Waukesha Biota is generally attributed to a combination of favorable conditions, including the transportation of the organisms to a sediment trap that was hostile to scavengers but favorable to the production of organic films that coated the surfaces of the dead organisms,  which inhibited decay, sometimes enhanced by promoting precipitation of a thin phosphatic coating, which is observed on many of the fossils.

Biota

Alga 
One genus of dasycladalean alga is known from the lagerstätte.

Hemichordata 
Many of the hemichordates are members of the group Graptolithina.

Cnidaria 
The cnidarians of the site are mainly represented by conulariids, but coral are also known.

Echinodermata 
Echinoderm fossils are rare at the site, but crinoids have been found here.

Brachiopoda 
Like many of the hard shelled organisms known from this site, the brachiopods found here are poorly preserved and rare.

Cephalopoda 
Normally common in Silurian deposits, nautiloid cephalopods are known from only a handful of specimens from the Waukesha biota.

"Worms" 
Multiple soft bodied fossils of "worms" and other vermiform animals are known from the site.

Arthropoda 
Arthropods dominate the fauna of the Waukesha biota in both number of specimens and diversity.

Chordata 
Multiple chordate fossils (possibly belonging to conodonts) are known from this site.

See also 

 Blackberry hill, a Cambrian aged lagerstätte in central Wisconsin
 Milwaukee formation, a Devonian aged fossil site in eastern Wisconsin
 Ludlow group, a group of lagerstättes of Silurian age in the British Isles

References 

Lagerstätten
Paleontology in Wisconsin
Prehistoric fauna by locality
Silurian United States
Sheinwoodian
Telychian